Alam Kandi (also Romanized as ‘Alam Kandī) is a village in Oryad Rural District, in the Central District of Mahneshan County, Zanjan Province, Iran. At the 2006 census, its population was 630, in 123 families.

References 

Populated places in Mahneshan County